Qonaqkənd (also, Konagkend, Konakhkend, and Konakkend) is a village and municipality in the Shamakhi Rayon of Azerbaijan.  It has a population of 835.

References 

Populated places in Shamakhi District